Abebaw Butako (born 20 April 1987 in Arba Minch) is an Ethiopian footballer. He currently plays for the Arba Minch FC.

Career

Abebaw is a defender and is part of the Ethiopia national football team. He began his career with Saint-George SA, the club where he played from 2005 - 2014. In August 2014 he transferred to one of Sudan's giant club Al-Hilal Omdurman. A year later he signed with his hometown club Arba Minch City, who made him the Ethiopian Premier League's highest-paid player with a salary of 75,000 birr a month.

International career

Abebaw debuted for Ethiopia in 2008. He is on the final list of players called for 2013 African Nations Cup.

International goals
Scores and results list Ethiopia's goal tally first.

References

External links
 
 

1987 births
Living people
Ethiopian footballers
Ethiopia international footballers
2013 Africa Cup of Nations players
Ethiopia A' international footballers
2014 African Nations Championship players
Sportspeople from Southern Nations, Nationalities, and Peoples' Region
Saint George S.C. players
Association football fullbacks
Al-Hilal Club (Omdurman) players
Arba Minch City F.C. players
Debub Police S.C. players
Ethiopian Premier League players
Ethiopian expatriate footballers
Ethiopian expatriate sportspeople in Sudan
Expatriate footballers in Sudan